Linux for mobile devices, sometimes referred to as mobile Linux, is the usage of Linux-based operating systems on portable devices, whose primary or only Human interface device (HID) is a touchscreen. It mainly comprises smartphones and tablet computers, but also some mobile phones, personal digital assistants (PDAs) portable media players that come with a touchscreen separately.

Mobile Linux is a relatively recent addition to the Linux range of use, with Google's Android operating system pioneering the concept. While UBPorts tried to follow suit with Ubuntu Touch, a wider development of free Linux operating systems specifically for mobile devices was only really spurred in the latter 2010s, when various smaller companies started projects to develop open source phones.

Lists

Operating systems
This is a list of Linux distros directly targeted towards use with mobile phones, being offered preconfigured with the mobile-oriented software listed below. There are both phone producers who develop their own operating systems and independent developments by community projects. Outside of these, several traditional distros have versions compiled for ARM architecture, which could be configured to use these components. This is done, for example, with Manjaro by the PinePhone.

Active
 Android
 /e/
 Android-x86
 Android Go
 EMUI (Non GMS compliant)
 Fire OS
 Lineage OS
 One UI
 Replicant
 VollaOS
 Wear OS
 Other custom Android distributions

 AsteroidOS (for wearables)
 EMUI/HarmonyOS (EMUI 12 onwards)
 KaiOS
 LuneOS (based on HP webOS)
 Maemo Leste (fork of discontinued Maemo based on Devuan)
 Mobian (based on Debian)
 postmarketOS (based on Alpine Linux)
 PureOS
 Sailfish OS (based on Nemo Mobile)
 SHR
 Tizen
 Ubuntu Touch (discontinued by Canonical, adopted by UBports Community)
 webOS

Discontinued
 Bada
 Firefox OS
 MeeGo
 Moblin
 Openmoko Linux
 OpenZaurus

Smartphones

Phones with Linux preinstalled:
 Librem 5
 Necuno
 PinePhone
 Volla Phone
 XFone

Middlewares
 BusyBox – small footprint alternative to GNU Core Utilities, under GNU GPLv2
 Fcitx
 Halium
 Intelligent Input Bus
 Maliit
 mer
 Smart Common Input Method
 Toybox – BSD licensed alternative to BusyBox
 Uim

UI
 GPE Palmtop Environment
 MauiShell (and MauiKit)
 Phosh
 Plasma Mobile
 Lomiri (previously known as Unity8)

See also 
 Anbox – allows Android apps to run on Linux distributions

References

Linux